The 1954–55 Liga Bet season was the last in which Liga Bet was the second tier of Israeli football, as the new Liga Leumit became the top division and Liga Alef became the second tier.

Hapoel Kiryat Haim (North Division champions) and Maccabi Jaffa (South Division champions) qualify for promotion\relegation play-offs with the 11th- and 12th-placed clubs in Liga Alef.

North Division

South Division

Promotion-relegation play-off
A promotion-relegation play-off between the 12th and 11th-placed teams in Liga Alef, Hapoel Kfar Saba and Beitar Jerusalem, and the winners of the regional divisions of Liga Bet, Maccabi Jaffa and Hapoel Kiryat Haim. Each team played the other three once.

References
1954-55 Bnei Yehuda 
Maccabi Jaffa and Hapoel Kiryat Haim in top of Liga Bet Al Hamishmar, 2.10.55, Historical Jewish Press 
Previous seasons The Israel Football Association 
In the Play-offs Davar, 23.10.55, Historical Jewish Press
In the Play-offs Davar, 30.10.55, Historical Jewish Press
Hapoel Kfar Saba and Maccabi Jaffa promoted to Liga Leumit Davar, 6.11.55, Historical Jewish Press

Liga Bet seasons
Israel
2